Founded in 2010, Averroes High School is a college preparatory Islamic high school (grades 9–12) in Fremont, California. It is the first Islamic high school in the Bay Area.

References

Islamic schools in California
Private high schools in California
Schools in Fremont, California
High schools in Alameda County, California
Educational institutions established in 2010
2010 establishments in California